KMGE (94.5 FM) is a commercial radio station licensed to Eugene, Oregon, United States.  It is owned by McKenzie River Broadcasting and calls itself "94-5 Mix FM."  KMGE broadcasts an adult contemporary radio format, switching to Christmas music for much of November and December, for the Eugene-Springfield radio market.

History
On , the station signed on as KBMC.  It was owned by the Milan Corp. It originally was powered at 3,400 watts, a fraction of its current power.  KBMC was acquired in October 1965 by Good Shepherd Broadcasting, Inc.  Good Shepherd aired a Christian radio format.

Good Shepherd Broadcasting, Inc., made a deal to transfer the broadcast license for KBMC to the Inspirational Broadcasting Corporation in 1978.  Under the Inspirational Broadcasting Corporation's ownership, KBMC continued to broadcast a religious radio format.

In September 1986, Inspirational Broadcasting Corp. reached an agreement to sell the station to McKenzie River Broadcasting Company, Inc.  The deal was approved by the Federal Communications Commission (FCC) on October 29, 1986, and the transaction was consummated on December 18, 1986.  The new owners had the FCC change the station's call letters to KMGE on January 6, 1987.

In early 1987, KMGE launched with a well-researched Adult Contemporary format branded as “Magic 94” which became "Magic 94.5" by 1999.  The station used the slogan “Today’s Hits and Yesterday’s Favorites.”

In 2008, KMGE rebranded as “94-5 Mix FM” with a slightly more upbeat Adult Contemporary presentation.

Awards and honors
KMGE was recognized by the Oregon Association of Broadcasters in 2001 as a runner-up for Best Commercial Spot Announcement-Radio and both winner and runner-up in the Best Commercial Promotional Campaign for a Client-Radio category.

Translators
KMGE programming is also carried on multiple broadcast translator stations to extend or improve the coverage area of the station.

References

External links
KMGE official website

MGE
Mainstream adult contemporary radio stations in the United States
Radio stations established in 1962
Lane County, Oregon
1962 establishments in Oregon